Cheryl Lynn Miller (born February 4, 1943) is an American actress and musician.

Early years
A California native, Miller is one of two children of an architect and film studio set designer, Howard Miller and accountant mother and travel agent, Elsie. She began acting as a young girl.

Career
The film Casanova Brown (1944) marked her screen debut at the age of 19 days. 
1965 was a break-through year for Miller. She was featured with an elephant and a chimp on the hit TV series Flipper. This caught the attention of the director (Ivan Tors) who later cast her in the film, Clarence, the Cross-Eyed Lion. In this film she played Paula Tracy, the daughter of veterinarian Marsh Tracy (Marshall Thompson). The film led to her role again playing Paula Tracy alongside Thompson in the CBS television series, Daktari, (1966–69).

During the summer of 1965, Walt Disney chose Miller as his own contractee,  dubbing her "The Typical American Girl".  
By early 1966, filming began for Daktari in Africa, U.S.A., a 200-acre ranch about 40 miles north of the Los Angeles metro area.

Later that year, Miller was one of 13 young actresses who were designated Hollywood Deb Stars of 1966. By the summer, she became Miss Golden Globe of 1966 and assisted Andy Williams in the presentation of the Golden Globe Awards. In 1966, she was voted as honorary mayor of Studio City, California.

Miller made many appearances in other television series, including Leave It to Beaver, Our Man Higgins, and The Donna Reed Show.  She  created the role of Samantha Pudding on the NBC soap opera, Bright Promise.

She also appeared in several other films, including The Monkey's Uncle, with Annette Funicello and Tommy Kirk and Guardian of the Wilderness with Denver Pyle as Galen Clark, John Dehner as John Muir and Ford Rainey as Abraham Lincoln.

Personal life

Miller married Stan Shapiro, a stockbroker, in 1968. She married again in 1979 in Hawaii to the CEO of Compact Video Systems and RTS Systems, Robert E. Seidenglanz, the inventor of the single camera, live television truck, and high definition television. They had a son, Erik, a year later. He is a composer and conceptual artist, and was featured in Jean-Luc Godard's last film, Goodbye to Language. Cheryl also raised Seidenglanz's other two children, Ronn and Rob, both filmmakers. Rob Seidenglanz is the director behind the Chilling Adventures of Sabrina, while Ronn is the founder of the film company Sidewayz, based in Idaho.

References

External links

 http://articles.latimes.com/1993-08-16/local/me-24414_1_corona-del-mar/ 
 http://articles.latimes.com/1995-01-17/news/ls-21096_1_corona-del-mar/ 

1943 births
Living people
Actresses from Los Angeles
American film actresses
American television actresses
Metro-Goldwyn-Mayer contract players
People from Sherman Oaks, Los Angeles
21st-century American women